Samuel Atkinson Waterston (born November 15, 1940) is an American actor. Waterston is known for his work in theater, television and, film. He has received numerous accolades including a Primetime Emmy Award, Golden Globe Award, and Screen Actors Guild Award as well as a nominations for an Academy Award, a Tony Award, and a BAFTA Award. His acting career has spanned over five decades acting on stage and screen. Waterston received a star on the Hollywood Walk of Fame in 2010 and was inducted into the American Theater Hall of Fame in 2012.

Waterston studied at the Sorbonne in Paris and the American Actors Workshop. He started his career in theater on the New York stage, appearing in multiple revivals of Shakespeare. Waterson starred in numerous productions at the Public Theatre including Indians (1969), The Trial of Catonsville Nine (1970), A Doll's House (1975), Hamlet (1975), Measure for Measure (1977), and Benefactors (1980). He portrayed Abraham Lincoln on Broadway in Abe Lincoln in Illinois (1993) where he received a Tony Award for Best Actor in a Play nomination.

Waterston played Nick Carraway in The Great Gatsby (1974) earning a Golden Globe Award for Best Supporting Actor – Motion Picture nomination. He received critical acclaim for his portrayal of Sydney Schanberg in Roland Joffe's The Killing Fields (1984), for which he received a nomination for the Academy Award for Best Actor. Waterston has acted in multiple Woody Allen films including Interiors (1978), Hannah and Her Sisters (1986), September (1987), and Crimes and Misdemeanors (1989). Other notable roles include in Rancho Deluxe (1975), Hopscotch, and Heaven's Gate (both in 1980), The Man in the Moon (1991), Serial Mom (1994), Nixon (1995), Miss Sloane (2016) and On the Basis of Sex (2018).

In 1973, one of his early television roles included a television film adaptation of Tennessee Williams' The Glass Menagerie, alongside Katharine Hepburn. He gained stardom portraying Jack McCoy on the NBC crime series Law & Order (1994–2010, 2022–), for which he received a Screen Actors Guild Award along with Golden Globe Award and Emmy Award nominations. He also portrayed Abraham Lincoln in the miniseries Lincoln (1988) and the Ken Burns miniseries The Civil War (1990). From 2012 to 2014 he portrayed Charlie Skinner in Aaron Sorkin's political HBO drama series The Newsroom. Other notable roles include in  Godless (2017), Grace and Frankie (2015–2022), and The Dropout (2022).

Early life and education
Sam Waterston, the third of four siblings (Roberta, George, and Ellen), was born in Cambridge, Massachusetts. His mother, Alice Tucker (née Atkinson), a landscape painter, was of English ancestry and a descendant of passengers on the Mayflower. His father, George Chychele Waterston was a semanticist, language teacher, and an emigrant from Leith, Scotland.
Waterston attended high school at the Groton School, graduating in the class of 1958. He received a BA from Yale College, class of 1962.

Career

Stage

The classically trained Waterston has numerous stage credits to his name. For example, he played an award-winning Benedick in Joseph Papp's production of William Shakespeare's Much Ado About Nothing and played the title role in Hamlet. Throughout Waterston's theater career, he continued to act alongside the best theater had to offer. On October 13, 1969, he starred in Arthur Kopit's play Indians on Broadway at the Brooks Atkinson Theatre. The play was directed by Gene Frankel, and he acted alongside Stacy Keach as Buffalo Bill, Manu Tupou as Sitting Bull, and other actors such as Tom Aldredge, Kevin Conway, Charles Durning, and Raul Julia. The play ran for 96 performances and 16 previews.

In 1977, he starred in an Off-Broadway production of William Shakespeare's Measure for Measure as Duke Vincentio alongside Meryl Streep and John Cazale at the Delacorte Theatre.  In 1980, he starred in Benefactors alongside Glenn Close, Mary Beth Hurt, and Simon Jones at The Brooks Atkinson Theatre on Broadway. In 1993, he portrayed Abraham Lincoln onstage in Abe Lincoln in Illinois where he received Tony Award, Drama Desk Award, and Outer Critics Circle Award nominations for his performance.

He continues live theater work during the summers, often seen acting in such venues as Long Wharf Theatre and the Yale Repertory Theatre in New Haven. Waterston appeared as Polonius in the 2008 Shakespeare in the Park production of Hamlet. His performance received excellent reviews in The New York Times and many other newspapers around the country, particularly in the northeast. In 2015, Waterston appeared as Prospero in a Shakespeare in the Park production of The Tempest, directed by Michael Greif.

Television
In 1994, Waterston debuted as Executive Assistant District Attorney Jack McCoy in the fifth season of the television series Law & Order. He played the role of McCoy, who would eventually become District Attorney, through the series finale in 2010, and has reprised the role throughout the Law and Order franchise. Upon the show's cancellation, Waterston was the second longest-serving cast member (behind S. Epatha Merkerson), having reprised his role through 16 seasons. Due to the success of the New York–based TV series, Waterston and his fellow longtime Law & Order castmate Jerry Orbach were declared "Living Landmarks" by the New York Landmarks Conservancy.

In 2021, Waterston was cast in the revival of Law & Order, reprising his role as District Attorney Jack McCoy. He appeared on The Late Show with Stephen Colbert to promote the show.

Waterston has had several other high profile television roles, including his portrayal of cable news president Charlie Skinner in The Newsroom, an HBO series by Aaron Sorkin.

In 2015, Waterston joined the cast of the Netflix series Grace and Frankie, starring alongside Martin Sheen, Jane Fonda and Lily Tomlin. In an interview with the New York Daily News, Waterston supported Tomlin and Fonda in demanding higher salaries than the supporting actors, saying, "I think they're being cheated." His character Sol appeared on all seven seasons of the show, which concluded in 2022. 

Waterston has appeared as a celebrity contestant on Jeopardy! twice. In his first appearance, which aired on May 1, 1997, Waterston faced off against his castmates Carey Lowell and Benjamin Bratt and won the game, raising $23,800 for Refugees International, an organization that advocates for better treatment of displaced people around the world. He made his second appearance on November 10, 2006, taking on Kathryn Erbe of Law & Order: Criminal Intent and Christopher Meloni of Law & Order: Special Victims Unit. Waterston finished in second place behind Meloni with a total score of $12,000, but was awarded $25,000 for his charities as a runner-up. In addition to supporting Refugees International, Waterston also donated part of his price to the environmental group Oceana. 

He made a popular cameo appearance on an episode of Saturday Night Live as himself, extolling the virtues of Old Glory Insurance, meant to protect the elderly from robot attacks.

Other activities
On February 12, 2009, Waterston joined the Aaron Copland School of Music at Queens College orchestra and chorus, along with the Riverside Inspirational Choir and NYC Labor Choir, in honoring Abraham Lincoln's 200th birthday at the Riverside Church in New York City. Under the direction of Maurice Peress, they performed Earl Robinson's "The Lonesome Train: A Music Legend for Actors, Folk Singers, Choirs, and Orchestra" in which Waterston depicted Abraham Lincoln.

Personal life
In 1975, Waterston divorced his first wife, Barbara Rutledge-Johns. They have one son, James, also an actor. In 1976, Waterston married his second wife, a former model, Lynn Louisa Woodruff.  They have three children, daughters Katherine Waterston and Elisabeth Waterston, who are also actresses, and a son, Graham.

Waterston is a board member of Oceana. In 2012, Waterston received the Goodermote Humanitarian Award from the Johns Hopkins Bloomberg School of Public Health for his longtime support of refugees around the world.

Waterston is a practicing Episcopalian.

He was a spokesman for the Unity08 movement, which unsuccessfully sought to run a non- or bipartisan presidential ticket in the 2008 presidential election. Waterston has stated that he was a Democrat until he left the party in disgust following the airing of Lyndon B. Johnson's "Daisy" election advertisement in 1964. However he endorsed Democratic President Barack Obama for re-election in 2012, and is currently a registered Democrat.

Waterston is a longtime friend and fan of the Mark Morris Dance Group and hosted the television presentation of Mozart Dances on PBS's Live from Lincoln Center on August 16, 2007.

Waterston has a summer home in Mattapoisett, Massachusetts.

On October 18, 2019, Waterston was arrested with Grace and Frankie co-star Jane Fonda for protesting the Trump administration's policies concerning climate change outside the U.S. Capitol in Washington, D.C.

Acting credits

Awards and honors

Waterston received an Academy Award nomination for Best Actor for his performance in The Killing Fields (1984), losing to F. Murray Abraham for his role in Amadeus (1984). He also received a Tony Award nomination for Best Actor in a Play for his performance in the Broadway revival of Abe Lincoln in Illinois (1994). Waterston is known for his role as Jack McCoy in the popular long running criminal investigation series Law & Order for which he received 3 Primetime Emmy Award nominations and a Golden Globe Award nomination. He also received 11 Screen Actors Guild Award nominations for Law & Order, winning in 1999 for Outstanding Performance by a Male Actor in a Drama Series. He also received 3 Primetime Emmy Award nominations for I'll Fly Away as well as two Golden Globe Award nominations for the series, winning in 1994. 

In 2003, Waterston received The Lincoln Forum's Richard Nelson Current Award of Achievement. AllMovie historian Hal Erickson characterized Waterston as having "cultivated a loyal following with his quietly charismatic, unfailingly solid performances."

On January 7, 2010, Waterston received the 2,397th star on the Hollywood Walk of Fame. In 2012, he was inducted into the American Theatre Hall of Fame.

References

External links
 
 
 
 
 
 Memory and Imagination: New Pathways to the Library of Congress—Documentary

1940 births
Living people
20th-century American male actors
20th-century American Episcopalians
21st-century American male actors

Male actors from Cambridge, Massachusetts  
Abraham Lincoln in art
American humanitarians
American male film actors
American male television actors
American male voice actors
American people of English descent
American people of Scottish descent
American male Shakespearean actors
American male stage actors
Best Drama Actor Golden Globe (television) winners
Emmy Award winners
Best Supporting Actor in a Television Film or Miniseries Canadian Screen Award winners
Groton School alumni
Outstanding Performance by a Male Actor in a Drama Series Screen Actors Guild Award winners
University of Paris alumni
Yale College alumni
People from Mattapoisett, Massachusetts
Brooks School alumni